Marco Pompetti (born 22 May 2000) is an Italian footballer who plays as a midfielder for  club Südtirol, on loan from Inter Milan.

Club career
On 5 October 2020, he was recalled from loan to Pisa and was loaned to Serie C club Cavese.

On 9 July 2022, Pompetti was loaned to Südtirol.

Career statistics

Club

Notes

References

2000 births
Sportspeople from Pescara
Footballers from Abruzzo
Living people
Italian footballers
Italy youth international footballers
Association football midfielders
Delfino Pescara 1936 players
Inter Milan players
U.C. Sampdoria players
Pisa S.C. players
Cavese 1919 players
F.C. Südtirol players
Serie B players
Serie C players